Prince Yakov Lobanov-Rostovsky (1660 – 23 May 1732) was a Rurikid prince of the Lobanov-Rostovsky family and Russian statesman and civil servant.

1660 births
1732 deaths
Yakov